JoJo is an American pop/R&B recording artist. She has written and recorded material for her four studio albums, JoJo (2004), The High Road (2006), Mad Love (2016), Good To Know (2020), a Christmas album, December Baby (2020), and two mixtape Can't Take That Away from Me (2010) and Agápē  (2012). Songs included in this list are from her studio albums, mixtapes as well as collaborations with other recording artists on duets and featured songs on their respective albums, as well as her written material for other recording artists and the tracks from her upcoming capsule project Trying Not To Think About It which is to release October 1. JoJo has also lent her vocals to several charity songs and television advertisements.

Career 

JoJo made her chart debut on July 24, 2004 with the worldwide hit, "Leave (Get Out)", after signing a deal with record labels Blackground Records and Da Family Entertainment at age 12 in 2003. She began working with some producers on her platinum-selling debut album, JoJo, which is primarily a pop and R&B album. The album's second singles, "Baby It's You" features American rapper Bow Wow on the single release version, however, The album version of the song is performed by JoJo herself. Although it failed to match the success of her debut single, the song was successful in many countries. "Not that Kinda Girl" was released as the album's third and final single. The single received a limited release, only receiving minimal airplay in the US. Due to lack of a physical CD in many countries, the single was a commercial failure compared to her other two singles. Following the 2004 Indian Ocean earthquake and Hurricane Katrina in 2005 JoJo was featured on the charity record, "Come Together Now", alongside "Celine Dion", "The Game" and "Jesse McCartney" among others. JoJo was also featured on the 2004 soundtrack for Shark Tale on a song called "Secret Love".

In 2006, JoJo released her gold-certified sophomore album, entitled The High Road, which contained more urban-pop/R&B and Hip Hop influenced songs. The album spawned three singles, including the worldwide hit song "Too Little Too Late" which broke the record for the biggest jump into the top three on the Billboard Hot 100 chart, moving from number sixty-six to number three in one week; this record was previously held by Mariah Carey with her 2001 single "Loverboy", which went from number sixty to number two. as well as "How to Touch a Girl" and "Anything".  In 2009, JoJo collaborated with Timbaland and appeared on his second studio album Shock Value II on the songs Lose Control & Timothy Where Have You Been which also featured Jet. JoJo was also featured on the soundtrack for the 2009 film More than a Game on a song called If You Dream with Tank alongside Jordin Sparks, Tyrese and Toni Braxton, among others.

JoJo released her debut mixtape, Can't Take That Away From Me on September 7, 2010 for free digital download through Rap-Up.com. The mixtape drew upon more pop, hip-hop and soulful genres compared to her previous albums with the mixtapes first single being a track titled In The Dark. JoJo released her second free mixtape entitled Agápē on her 22nd birthday on December 20, 2012, and marking the follow-up to her 2010 mixtape. The mixtape has spawned three singles so far with the first being "We Get By" which was released for free online on November 15, 2012 on JoJo's official SoundCloud with a limited number of downloads, with JoJo stating "there's a limit on the download because we want you to download the entire mixtape once its released". The second single "Andre" was released on November 30, 2012.  The song was inspired by the OutKast rapper's 2003 album The Love Below. The songs accompanying music video was directed by Patrick "Embryo" Tapu and made its official premiere on official worldwide premiere on March 21, 2013 exclusively through Complex Magazine. The mixtapes third and current single "Thinking Out Loud" is currently scheduled to premiere in June 2013 which will include the full extended version of the song, along with the accompanying music video which was shot on March 29, 2013 in Downtown Los Angeles with director Aaron A. "Can't Handle The Truth" is set to be released as the fourth single.

In 2015 JoJo released an extended play titled III. Its lead single was “When Love Hurts”. The other two tracks are “Save My Soul” and “Say Love”.

JoJo released her third studio album, Mad Love, October 14, 2016. It debuted #6 on the Billboard hot 200. It spawned 3 singles “F*** Apologies” which features Wiz Khalifa, “FAB” which features female rapper Remy Ma, and “I Can Only” which features Canadian singer-songwriter Alessia Cara.

On May 1, 2020, JoJo released her fourth studio album Good to Know. It debuted at #33 on the Billboard 200 and spawned 2 singles. "Man" being the first single released March 13. She then later released "Lonely Hearts" as the second single with a remix featuring singer Demi Lovato on the deluxe version of the album

Released songs

Unreleased songs
During the recording process for JoJo's third studio album, with working titles like Jumping Trains and All I Want Is Everything, dozens of tracks had leaked onto the net including short snippets and full length songs. As of April 2021, over 50 tracks have leaked onto the net, several album's worth of material as well as numerous titles being registered on sites such as ASCAP and BMI. One of the leaked tracks titled Can't Take That Away from Me was included on JoJo's debut mixtape.

See also 
 JoJo discography

References 

JoJo